Charles Hay, 13th Earl of Erroll (1677 – 16 October 1717) was a Scottish peer and Lord High Constable of Scotland who strongly opposed the 1707 union of Scotland and England.

Biography

Charles Hay was the eldest son of John Hay, and his wife, Anne, daughter of James Drummond, the 3rd Earl of Perth.

He also succeeded his father as Chancellor of King's College, Aberdeen; in 1704 to 1717.

The earl was opposed to the union of Scotland and England in 1707, voicing his dissent:

"I, Charles, Earl of Erroll, Lord High Constable of Scotland, do hereby protest — that the office of High Constable, with all the rights and privileges of the same, belonging to me heritably, and depending upon the Monarchy, Sovereignty, and ancient constitution of this Kingdom, may not be prejudiced by the Treaty of Union between Scotland and England, nor any article, clause, or condition thereof, but that the said heritable office, with all the rights and privileges thereof, may remain to me and my successors, entire and unhurt by any votes or Acts of Parliament whatever relating to the said Union ; and I crave that this, my protestation, may be recorded in the registers and rolls of Parliament."

During the Jacobite uprising in 1708, Erroll was arrested and imprisoned in Edinburgh Castle on suspicion of his involvement with the attempted French invasion.

The earl died unmarried, aged 40. As he died childless, the earldom fell to his sister Mary, Countess of Erroll, who became the first suo jure countess of Erroll.

References

1677 births
1717 deaths
13
17th-century Scottish people
Charles, 13
Cavaliers